Tenaris may refer to:
 Tenaris, a global manufacturer and supplier of steel pipes
 Tenaris (plant), a plant genus in the Apocynaceae or dogbane family
 Tenaris, a genus of butterflies in the family Nymphalidae; synonym of Taenaris

See also
 Tenarus, a town of ancient Laconia